Sandra le Grange (born 5 July 1993) is a South African female badminton player. In 2013, she won bronze medal at the African Badminton Championships in women's doubles event with her partner Elme de Villiers.

Achievements

African Badminton Championships
Women's Singles

Women's Doubles

BWF International Challenge/Series
Women's Doubles

Mixed Doubles

 BWF International Challenge tournament
 BWF International Series tournament
 BWF Future Series tournament

References

External links 
 
 
 

1993 births
Living people
Sportspeople from Johannesburg
South African female badminton players
Badminton players at the 2014 Commonwealth Games
Commonwealth Games competitors for South Africa
Competitors at the 2015 African Games
African Games silver medalists for South Africa
African Games medalists in badminton
21st-century South African women